Robert Eden (b Newcastle upon Tyne 26 August 1701; d Winchester 11 July 1759) was  an English priest.

Eden was educated at Lincoln College, Oxford. He was incorporated at Cambridge in 1734.

He was Archdeacon of Winchester from 1743 until his resignation in 1749. He was then archdeacon again from 1756 until his death.

Notes

1701 births
People from Newcastle upon Tyne
1759 deaths
Archdeacons of Winchester (ancient)
Alumni of Lincoln College, Oxford